Genkaku Allergy (幻覚アレルギ－) was a Japanese visual kei rock band started by ex-Kamaitachi members Sceana and Kazzy, in 1992. Its sound mixes elements from hardcore punk, heavy metal, noise and industrial music. They signed with Victor Entertainment in 1994. Genkaku Allergy disbanded in 1997, but in 2006 vocalist Sceana regrouped the band for one last show.

Band history
In 1992, following the end of Kamaitachi, Sceana and Kazzy started Genkaku Allergy. The same year their first EP, Mouth to Mouth, was released by Free-Will. This first work quickly climbed up the indie charts to the first position. In 1994, they achieved a deal with major label, Victor Entertainment. After their final album, D no Susume, Genkaku Allergy disbanded in early 1997. Nine years later, Sceana revived the group for one last concert on March 12, 2006, with Kazzy only playing support under the alias Kazii Sasuke.

Musicians
 Sceana – vocals (ex:Kamaitachi)
 Kazzy – guitar (ex:Kamaitachi)

Support members
 Tetsuji "Tetsu" Yamada – guitar (ex:Bellzlleb)
 Horie – drums 1996
 Kimura – drums 1992–1995 (ex:Bellzlleb)

Discography
 Mouth to Mouth (April 21, 1992)
 Psyche:Delic (March 30, 1994), Oricon Albums Chart Peak Position: No. 25
 Japanese Trash (December 16, 1994) No. 66
 D no Susume (「D」のススメ, February 21, 1996, Produced by Ken, ex:Zi:Kill) No. 56

References

Visual kei musical groups
Japanese hardcore punk groups
Japanese noise rock groups
Japanese heavy metal musical groups
Japanese industrial music groups
Musical groups established in 1992
Musical groups disestablished in 1997
Musical groups from Kyoto Prefecture